As of 2023, 76 places are heritage-listed in the Shire of Coorow, of which none are on the State Register of Heritage Places, which is maintained by the Heritage Council of Western Australia.

List
The following places are heritage listed in the Shire of Coorow:

References

Coorow
Shire of Coorow